The Ministry of Peace and CPA Implementation is a ministry in South Sudan. It was formed in July 2011 following South Sudan's independence, and Pagan Amum Okech was sworn in on July 23 as the department's first minister.

The mandate of the Ministry is to promote peace, healing, reconciliation, unity and dialogue amongst institutions and the people of Southern Sudan.

List of Ministers of Peace

References

Peace
South Sudan, Peace
South Sudan